Geno Mazzanti (April 1, 1929 – July 24, 2013) was an American football halfback.

A native of Lake Village, Arkansas, he played college football for the Arkansas Razorbacks. He ran 77 yards for the game-winning touchdown against Vanderbilt in 1949 and was selected by the United Press as a second-team back on the 1949 All-Southwest Conference football team.

Mazzanti was selected by the Baltimore Colts in the 26th round (327th overall pick) of the 1950 NFL Draft.  He signed with the Colts in May 1950. He played at the halfback position during the 1950 Colts season. He appeared in a total of five NFL games and had seven carries for 22 yards and one touchdown.

He also played in the Canadian Football League for the Ottawa Rough Riders during the 1952 season. He appeared in four games for Ottawa, three of them as a starter. He also served as an assistant coach for the 1952 Rough Riders.

References

1929 births
2013 deaths
Baltimore Colts players
Arkansas Razorbacks football players
Players of American football from Arkansas
People from Lake Village, Arkansas
Baltimore Colts (1947–1950) players